The women's 100 metres sprint event at the 1932 Olympic Games took place between August 1 and August 2 at the Los Angeles Memorial Coliseum.  The final was won by Pole Stanisława Walasiewicz.

In 1980, after her shooting death as a bystander at an armed robbery, 1932 race winner Stanisława Walasiewicz was revealed to be intersex, and possibly ineligible to compete under modern gender determination tests.  No change has been made to the records for the 1932 women's 100 metres race.

Results

Heats

Heat 1

Heat 2

Heat 3

Heat 4

Semifinals

Semifinal 1

Semifinal 2

Final

References

Athletics at the 1932 Summer Olympics
100 metres at the Olympics
1932 in women's athletics
Ath